The flap-necked chameleon (Chamaeleo dilepis) is a species of arboreal chameleon, a lizard in the family Chamaeleonidae. The species is native to sub-Saharan Africa. There are eight recognized subspecies, including the nominotypical subspecies.

Subspecies
The following subspecies of the flap-necked chameleon are recognized as being valid.

Chamaeleo dilepis dilepis  – flap-necked chameleon
Chamaeleo dilepis idjwiensis  – Idjwi Island flap-necked chameleon
Chamaeleo dilepis isabellinus  – Isabelline flap-necked chameleon
Chamaeleo dilepis martensi  – Pemba Island flap-necked chameleon
Chamaeleo dilepis petersii  – Peters' flap-necked chameleon
Chamaeleo dilepis quilensis 
Chamaeleo dilepis roperi 
Chamaeleo dilepis ruspolii

Etymology
The subspecific name roperi is in honor of G.D. Trevor-Roper.

The subspecific name ruspolii is in honor of Italian explorer Prince Eugenio Ruspoli.

Description
Colouring ranges through various shades of green, yellow, and brown. There is usually a pale stripe on the lower flanks and one to three pale patches higher on the flanks.

Geographic range and habitat
Chamaeleo dilepis has a very wide distribution, occurring throughout much of sub-Saharan Africa from as far north as Ethiopia and Somalia to a western extreme of Cameroon, and as far south as northern South Africa. It inhabits coastal forest, moist or dry savannah, woodland and bushy grasslands, and may also venture into rural and suburban areas.

Ecology
The adult female flap-necked chameleon lays 10-40 eggs in a hole dug in soil. The eggs take 10–12 months to hatch. The diet of C. dilepis includes a variety of invertebrates, although large individuals may take geckos and other chameleons. The species is itself commonly preyed on by snakes such as the boomslang and the twig snake.

Captivity
Chamaeleo dilepis does well in captivity. It is mostly active during the day. When this species is in captivity, it is very important to create an environment very much like its natural climate. It may be fed a diet including crickets, mealworms, wax worms, and other locally caught insects. Its estimated life expectancy is 5–8 years.

Conservation
The flap-necked chameleon is in heavy demand for the international pet trade, being the third most highly traded chameleon species. More than 111,000 individuals were exported between 1977 and 2011, mostly to the USA. No detrimental effects on the total population size have been observed so far, although more in-depth studies have been recommended. The species is currently classified as Least Concern by the IUCN.

References

Further reading
Branch, Bill (2004). Field Guide to Snakes and other Reptiles of Southern Africa. Third Revised edition, Second impression. Sanibel Island, Florida: Ralph Curtis Books. 399 pp. . (Chamaeleo dilepis, pp. 227–228 + Plate 96).
Leach WE (1819). "Appendix. No. IV. Reptilia. (Reptiles.)" pp. 493–496. In: Bowdich TE (1819). Mission from Cape Coast Castle to Ashantee, with a Statistical Account of that Kingdom, and Geographical Notices of other Parts of the Interior of Africa. London: John Murray. viii + 512 pp. (Chamaeleo dilepis, new species, p. 493). (in English and Latin).
Main DC, van Vuuren BJ, Tolley KA (2018). "Cryptic diversity in the common flap-necked chameleon Chamaeleo dilepis in South Africa". African Zoology 53 (3): 11–16. 
Reaney LT, Yee S, Losos JB, Whiting MJ (2012). "Ecology of the Flap-necked Chameleon Chamaeleo dilepis in Southern Africa". Breviora (532): 1–18.
Reissig J, Boshoff D (2013). "Chamaeleo dilepis dilepis Leach, 1819, Common Flap-neck Chameleon, Reproduction". African Herp News, Newsletter of the Herpetological Association of Africa (59): 44–45.

Chamaeleo
Lizards of Africa
Reptiles described in 1819
Taxa named by William Elford Leach
Chameleons
Afrotropical realm fauna
Reptiles of Africa
Reptiles of Sub-Saharan Africa
Reptiles of Central Africa
Reptiles of East Africa
Reptiles of Southern Africa
Reptiles of Cameroon
Reptiles of South Sudan
Reptiles of Ethiopia
Reptiles of Somalia
Reptiles of Kenya
Reptiles of Uganda
Reptiles of Gabon
Reptiles of Equatorial Guinea
Reptiles of Angola
Reptiles of Zambia
Reptiles of Tanzania
Reptiles of Namibia
Reptiles of Botswana
Reptiles of Zimbabwe
Reptiles of Mozambique
Reptiles of Malawi
Reptiles of South Africa
Reptiles of Eswatini
Reptiles of Lesotho
Reptiles as pets